The 2007 German Athletics Championships were held at the Steigerwaldstadion in Erfurt on 21–22 July 2007.

Results

Men

Women

References 
 Results source: 

2007
German Athletics Championships
German Athletics Championships